Blairdenon Hill is a hill in the Ochil Hills range, part of the Central Lowlands of Scotland. It is the highest point on the western portion of the range. Approximately 220m west of the summit lies the site of a plane wreckage of a De Havilland DH 82 Tiger Moth which crashed on the 30th August 1957 and killed the pilot, A. J. Cuthbertson - a small, white cross stand at the site in memoriam.

References 

Mountains and hills of Clackmannanshire
Hills of the Scottish Midland Valley
Donald mountains